Key markets are markets that are essential for extending a company's market position, its economic growth and its globalization in a sustainable way. The concept is necessarily not a sharp one, rather, it may depend on company-specific cost-effectiveness or profitability thresholds. Key markets may also only exist in a company's vision statement as projections of future profitability in emerging markets.

See also
market economy

Market (economics)